Math the Band is an American chiptune-based synthpunk band from Providence, Rhode Island formed in 2002 by Kevin Steinhauser. Originally being a solo project by Steinhauser, the band's style has been sometimes called Nintendocore. The band has performed over 1000 shows throughout the United States, Mexico, Canada, and the United Kingdom, touring with bands, artists and rappers such as Andrew W.K., Japanther, Wheatus, MC Frontalot, Horse the Band MC Chris, Peelander-Z, Anamanaguchi and MC Lars. Math the Band has been featured in several magazines such as Venus Zine and Keyboard Magazine, and were also featured on NPR Music. Still, with band members spread across the United States, Math the Band is based in Providence, Rhode Island and are a part of Providence's AS220 and have performed there multiple times.

Since 2017, Math the Band has been Kevin Steinhauser, Max Holbrook, Adam Waz, and Matt Zappa.

History

Formation as a solo project and early years (2002–2006)
Math the Band was originally the solo project of sixteen-year-old Kevin Steinhauser created in 2002, "doing his own thing" after getting kicked out of other bands he was in during high school for reasons he attributed to him "not being any good" – most notably, Christian pop punk band The Schwartz where he played guitar and was the only non-religious member. The origin of the name Math the Band originates from Steinhauser thinking of band names and having a pin on his backpack that simply said "Math" on it and he wanted a pin for his band so he named the band after the pin. During this time starting in 2002, Steinhauser released the studio albums: Robots Will Rise, Eep! An EP!, One Man Band For Single-Celled Organisms, The Lost Levels, Math the Band and the Secret of Mystery Island, Imaginary Everything, Greatest Hits and All Good Things, All in Good Time all under the Math the Band name and did live shows with a laptop and sometimes a box of costumes.

Transition to duo (2007–2017)

Steinhauser met Justine Mainville after playing a few shows with her then-band The Reaganauts while they were both in college.  They later became friends and dated, leading Steinhauser to ask her to join on drums and synthesizer in 2007. The duo lineup of Math the Band released the studio albums: Math the Band Banned the Math, Don't Worry, Get Real, No Thing,  Stupid and Weird and Math the Band the Band the Album.

Transition to band and Flange Factory Five (2018–present)
Mainville later left the band and Max Holbrook, Adam Waz and Matt Zappa joined the band. In 2019 and 2020 they performed at PAXEast and MAGFest and played with a setlist featuring yet-unreleased songs announced as part of their young adult fantasy novel. On April 20, 2020 they released the single "Wet Cement", the music video's description announced it as part of Flange Factory Five, a five-part series of releases based on the band's yet to be released at the time studio album of the same name. The album itself released on October 1, 2020, and is the third release in a collection of five monthly releases. The second single from the album titled "Duel of the Deer" released on July 5, 2020. The first release under the name Flange Factory Five was Flange Factory Five: the Novel a book which is a "fantasy adventure novel with magic, wizards and other characters". On October 23, 2020, the band streamed the first part of live reading the book on their YouTube account. The second release was an energy drink advertised as "A New Sport Utility Beverage" The fourth release was a guitar pedal, Steinhauser describes it as "a replica of the pedal that’s a playback device of the album, and you can make the sound go all weird." and was originally planned for a release in November but was released in early December along with an accompanying demo. The fifth was planned for a release in December and be a video game for the Game Boy Color, it is unknown when it will release but is currently in development, its released date was delayed due to their making sure the game was up to "gamer standards".

On March 16, 2021, Math the Band announced an online concert at AS220 for March 25, it was their first show since the COVID-19 pandemic. On April 1, the band released the music video for "That Thing You Don't", in the video the band stars on a fictional TV show titled Good Morning Void, at the end of the video, Steinhauser and a fictional manager are seen in the studio watching the performance, before the manager begins berating Steinhauser, and eventually "firing" him, upon being asked by Steinhauser who would replace him, the release of "Duel of the Deer (Matt the Band)" single was announced and released the same day.

For April Fools 2022, Math the Band live streamed an "album delease" for Flange Factory Five featuring Steinhauser and Waz playing the entire album, providing commentary and subsequently destroying copies of multiple versions of Flange Factory Five removing it from streaming services, since then the album has remained removed. Steinhauser also mentioned the delay of the Game Boy Color game saying "it originally was going to be a five-minute-long thing that just got to a point in the book, and it was like do this thing and then I was like I wanna make it a longer thing and it's just not done yet." Him and Waz also joked that after the album delease and it's finished, it could be "preleased".

On January 7, 2023, Math the Band performed at Super MAGFest 2023.

Musical style and influences
Math the Band has described their music as "glitched-out, chaotic, celebration pop for the constantly anxious." Stylistically, the band is characterized as Nintendocore, punk rock, chiptune, indie rock, synthpunk, dance-punk, electronic, synth-pop, pop and pop punk

Math the Band uses vintage analog synthesizers, drum machines, hacked second and third generation video game consoles and homemade synthesizers to make loud and fast, punk rock music. Math the Band, specifically Steinhauser has cited Atom and His Package, Andrew W.K., Steve Roggenbuck Nathan Fielder, and Devo as influences.

Band members

Current members 
 Kevin Steinhauser - guitar, programming, lead vocals , laptop 
 Max Holbrook - guitar, backing vocals 
 Adam Waz - bass, backing vocals 
 Matt Zappa - drums

Former members 
 Scott - bass
 Joe DeGeorge - keyboard , saxophone 
 Neil King - drums 
 Justine Mainville - synthesizer, backing vocals, drum tom, drum cymbal, sequence track 
 Jeff McGowan - bass 
 Jon Pagano - guitar, synthesizer

Former touring members 
 Zach Burba - drums 
 Unknown - trombone

Timeline

Discography

Studio albums

Compilation albums

Extended plays

Singles

Compilations and soundtracks
 2009 - Up End Atom: A Tribute To Atom And His Package
Features the track "Upside Down From Here" (originally by Atom and His Package)
 2012 - Let's Big Happy (Original Soundtrack)
Features the track "Bad Jokes"
 2020 -  AS220 Summer Sampler 2020
Features the track "Wet Cement"
 2020 - LINE THE FRONT: A BENEFIT COMPILATION FOR RI SOLIDARITY FUND
Features the track "Duel Of The Deer (previously unreleased)"

Other appearances
 2014 - For all the Girls - 70 Love Songs
"Desirae (feat. Math the Band)"

Music videos

Filmography

Bibliography
 Flange Factory Five: the Novel (2020)

References

External links

 
 
 
 Math the Band on YouTube
 

Musical groups established in 2001
Musical groups from Rhode Island
Punk rock groups from Rhode Island
Musical groups from Providence, Rhode Island
Nintendocore musical groups
Dance-punk musical groups
Chiptune musical groups
Indie rock musical groups from Rhode Island
Electronic music groups from Rhode Island
Musicians from Providence, Rhode Island
American synth-pop groups
American pop rock music groups
American electronic rock musical groups
Electropunk musical groups